John Proby, 1st Baron Carysfort KB PC (25 November 1720 – 18 October 1772) was a British Whig politician.

Life
He was the son of John Proby, of Elton Hall, Huntingdonshire, and his wife Jane, daughter of John Leveson-Gower, 1st Baron Gower. He was educated at Jesus College, Cambridge.

Proby was returned to Parliament for Stamford in 1747, a seat he held until 1754, and then represented Huntingdonshire from 1754 to 1768. Carysfort served as a Lord of the Admiralty under the Duke of Devonshire in 1757 and under George Grenville from 1763 to 1765. In 1752 he was raised to the Peerage of Ireland as Baron Carysfort, of Carysfort in the County of Wicklow, and in 1758 he was admitted to the Irish Privy Council. In 1761 he was further honoured when he was made a Knight of the Order of the Bath.

Lord Carysfort died in October 1772, aged 51, and was succeeded in the barony by his son John, who was created Earl of Carysfort in 1789. Lady Carysfort died in March 1783, aged 60.

 was the first ship named in his honour following his service as Lord of the Admiralty. In 1941,  was named in his honour as the fifth Royal Navy warship to carry the name Carysfort.

Family
Proby married the Hon. Elizabeth Allen, daughter of Joshua Allen, 2nd Viscount Allen, in 1750: they had a son and a daughter. The daughter Elizabeth (1752–1808) married Thomas John Storer (died 1792).

References

www.thepeerage.com

1720 births
1772 deaths
People from Elton, Cambridgeshire
Alumni of Jesus College, Cambridge
Members of the Parliament of Great Britain for English constituencies
British MPs 1754–1761
British MPs 1761–1768
Members of the Privy Council of Ireland
Barons in the Peerage of Ireland
Peers of Ireland created by George II
Grand Masters of the Premier Grand Lodge of England
Freemasons of the Premier Grand Lodge of England
Knights of the Bath
Lords of the Admiralty